Frano Mlinar (born 30 March 1992) is a Croatian professional football who plays as a midfielder for Istra 1961.

Club career
A product of Dinamo Zagreb Academy, Mlinar was promoted to the club's first team squad in January 2010, and had his professional league debut in the second part of the 2009–10 season. However, he made only one appearance for the club before the end of season and was subsequently loaned to NK Lokomotiva, Dinamo's farm team, in June 2010, staying there for a year and a half before cancelling his contract with Dinamo and moving to NK Inter Zaprešić.

On 1 July 2013, Mlinar joined Italian club Udinese Calcio for €1 million and he was given shirt number 14.

On 8 June 2021, Mlinar signed with Istra.

International career
Internationally, Mlinar represented Croatia at all youth levels up until the Croatia under-21 team.

References

External links
 

1992 births
Living people
Footballers from Zagreb
Association football midfielders
Croatian footballers
Croatia youth international footballers
Croatia under-21 international footballers
GNK Dinamo Zagreb players
NK Lokomotiva Zagreb players
NK Inter Zaprešić players
Udinese Calcio players
FC Aarau players
FC Wil players
Mezőkövesdi SE footballers
NK Slaven Belupo players
NK Istra 1961 players
Croatian Football League players
Swiss Super League players
Swiss Challenge League players
Nemzeti Bajnokság I players
Croatian expatriate footballers
Expatriate footballers in Italy
Expatriate footballers in Switzerland
Expatriate footballers in Hungary
Croatian expatriate sportspeople in Italy
Croatian expatriate sportspeople in Switzerland
Croatian expatriate sportspeople in Hungary